Frank Dawson Bean Jr. (born May 20, 1942) is Chancellor's Professor of Sociology and Director of the Center for Research on Immigration, Population and Public Policy at the University of California, Irvine.  Bean came to Irvine in 1999, after holding positions at the University of Texas and Indiana University.  He has a PhD in sociology from Duke University.

Accomplishments
Author or editor of more than 150 scholarly articles and chapters and 18 books, Bean's research focuses on international migration, unauthorized migration, U.S. immigration policy, and the demography of the U.S. Hispanic population.  A member of the Council on Foreign Relations, he has been a Guggenheim Fellow and held numerous visiting scholar positions (at the Russell Sage Foundation, the Transatlantic Academy,  the American Academy in Berlin, the Research School of Social Sciences at the Australian National University, and the Center for U.S./Mexico Studies at the University of California at San Diego).  He has mentored dozens of students, who hold (or have held) positions at such places as Georgetown University, UCLA, the University of Illinois, the University of Pennsylvania, Pennsylvania State University, Princeton University, the University of Washington, the Migration Policy Institute, and the U.S. Bureau of the Census.  A frequent recipient of foundation and federal grants, Bean has been a Principal Investigator of NICHD behavioral science grants in population in every decade since the inception of the program in 1969.  In 2011, he received the Distinguished Lifetime Scholarly Career Award in International Migration at the annual meeting of the American Sociological Association.

Intellectual Contributions
Bean's intellectual contributions span five areas.  The first is racial/ethnic fertility. The American Library Association gave a Choice award for academic distinction to his book Mexican American Fertility Patterns (with Gray Swicegood, 1985). This study shows that Mexican-origin women have higher birth rates because of their lower socioeconomic standing and work opportunities, not because of their cultural orientations, and that their fertility changes as they achieve higher levels of education.  A second area in which Bean is well-known is Hispanic demography, as indicated by his 1987 book The Hispanic Population of the United States (with Marta Tienda), which was commissioned by the National Committee for Research on the 1980 Census and the Russell Sage Foundation. Regarded as a canonical treatment of its subject, the work provides a comprehensive portrayal of Hispanics and shows, among other things, the crucial importance of considering Hispanic national-origin and nativity groups separately in policy-relevant research.

A third research area is unauthorized Mexican migration.  He co-directed a large research program at The Urban Institute and Rand Corporation on the implementation and effectiveness of the 1986 Immigration Reform and Control Act (IRCA), legislation that initiated employer penalties for hiring unauthorized workers and permitted legalization of unauthorized immigrants in the country.  His research involved developing estimates of how IRCA affected unauthorized migration and what factors affected flows from Mexico.  In the mid-1990s, he led a group of U.S. and Mexican scholars seeking to improve estimates of unauthorized migration for the Mexico/U.S. Binational Migration Study, mandated by the U.S. Commission on Immigration Reform. The research provided what The New York Times called in a front-page story "the first authoritative estimate of the net annual flow of illegal Mexican workers into the United States." This work also helped to spawn adjustments for coverage error in all subsequent official and widely accepted estimates of unauthorized migration.

A fourth contribution comes from his study of immigrant incorporation.  His book America's Newcomers and the Dynamics of Diversity (with Gillian Stevens) introduced the idea that predominantly lower-skilled labor migrant groups like Mexicans experience delays in (but not blockage of) incorporation, especially when their members arrive as unauthorized entrants.  Showing that many incorporation processes for such groups do not substantially emerge until the third generation, the study won the 2003 American Sociological Association's Otis Dudley Duncan award for the best book in social demography.  His fifth major contribution emerges from his examination of immigration and race/ethnicity in the United States.  An edited research volume, Help or Hindrance? The Economic Implications of Immigration for African Americans (with Daniel Hamermesh), received an ALA Choice award for academic distinction.  Also, his 2010 book, The Diversity Paradox: Immigration and the Color Line in 21st Century American (with Jennifer Lee), on how immigration has increased U.S. ethnoracial diversity and altered notions of racial identity in the United States, was awarded the ASA's 2011 Otis Dudley Duncan award for the best book in social demography. The latter study refutes claims that diversity fosters suspicion and withdrawal and shows instead that immigration-related diversity, more so than black-white diversity, increases intermarriage and leads to the dissolution of ethnoracial color lines, although less so for blacks compared to other groups.

Recent Books
 The Diversity Paradox:  Immigration and the Color Line in 21st Century America (with Jennifer Lee), New York: Russell Sage,  2010.
America's Newcomers and the Dynamics of Diversity (with Gillian Stevens),  New York: Russell Sage (ASA Arnold Rose Monograph Series),  2003.
Immigration and Opportunity: Race, Ethnicity, and Employment in the United States (with Stephanie Bell-Rose), Russell Sage Foundation, 1999.
Help or Hindrance? The Economic Implications of Immigration for African Americans (with Dan Hamermesh), Russell Sage Foundation, 1998.
At the Crossroads: Mexico and U.S. Immigration Policy (with Rodolfo de la Garza, Bryan Roberts, and Sidney Weintraub), Rowman and Littlefield, 1997.

References

External links
 http://www.faculty.uci.edu/profile.cfm?faculty_id=4622
 

1942 births
Living people
American sociologists
Economists from California
University of California, Irvine faculty
University of Texas faculty
21st-century American economists
Duke University alumni